James Purves may refer to:

James Purves (minister) (1734–1795), Scottish universalist minister
James Purves (politician) (1843–1910), Australian politician
J. R. W. Purves (James Richard William Purves, 1903–1979), Australian lawyer and philatelist
James Purves (cricketer) (born 1937), English cricketer